Voltz Lake is a residential and resort community within the village of Salem Lakes in south-central Kenosha County, Wisconsin, United States.

Notes

Neighborhoods in Wisconsin
Populated places in Kenosha County, Wisconsin